Raiders of Old California is a 1957 American black-and-white Western film produced and directed by Albert C. Gannaway and starring Jim Davis, Arleen Whelan, and Faron Young.

This film is now in the public domain.

It was the final film appearance of Arleen Whelan, who retired from acting in 1957; she died on April 7, 1993.

Plot
The film begins with the surrender of Capt. Miguel Sebastian (Dobkin) to Capt. McKane (Davis) from the U.S. Army at the end of Mexican-American War. Three years later, McKane was taking lands from their owners by intimidation and treachery.

Words reach Judge Ward Young (Heydt) and his son Marshal Faron Young (Young). After a talk with Pardee (Van Cleef), they investigate with Diego (Colmans), a farmer and an old veteran with Sebastian, and then they investigate with McKane, and learn about a witness in the deal named Johnson (Lauter). Pardee tries to threaten Johnson to keep him from saying anything. Johnson tells Judge Young about the deal and agrees to testify in court.

McKane's men ambush the lawmen and Johnson receives a dangerous wound, but tells them to look for Sebastian, who is still alive. They are overheard by Pardee, who goes to interrogate Diego and then kills him.

McKane's men follow Marshal Young and watch him survive an attack from the Comanches. They try to kill him, but he manages to shoot them first. He mortally wounds Boyle and takes him to the town priest. Dying Boyle identifies the priest as Miguel Sebastian himself. Pardee arrives in town and inquires about Sebastian from a drunk named Pepe (Diamond). He tries to kill Sebastian, but is gunned down by Young.

Upon this new finding, McKane is ordered to be in court. He sends his men to kill Sebastian, but he dodges them through underground passage. McKane plans a cattle stampede through town. In the trial, Sebastian testifies that he was forced to give his land to McKane under death threat, and that Johnson refused to sign as a witness because it was extortion and collaboration with the enemy, but he was forced to sign. Sebastian testifies that although he was permitted by McKane to then leave for Mexico, Pardee had tracked him and pushed him off a cliff, thinking he had left him for dead. Judge Young rules that the grant was illegal because McKane bargained with the enemy at war time, and that McKane will be sent to be court-martialed.

The court is interrupted by the coming of the stampede, and McKane is caught in the stampede and killed, along with the sheriff. Father Sebastian agrees to give the lands to the farmers.

Cast

 Jim Davis as Captain Angus Clyde McKane
 Arleen Whelan as Julie Johnson
 Faron Young as Marshal Faron Young
 
 Marty Robbins as Cpl. Timothy Boyle
 Lee Van Cleef as Sgt. Damon Pardee
 Louis Jean Heydt as Judge Ward Young
 
 Harry Lauter as Lt. Scott Johnson 
 Douglas Fowley as Sheriff
 Larry Dobkin as Don Miguel Sebastian
 Bill Coontz as Turk
 Don Diamond as Pepe
 Ric Vallon as Burt
 Tom Hubbard as Emmet

Production
Parts of the film were shot in Kanab Canyon, Utah.

Gallery

See also
 Public domain film
 List of American films of 1957
 List of films in the public domain in the United States

References

External links

1957 films
American black-and-white films
1957 Western (genre) films
American Western (genre) films
Films shot in Utah
1950s English-language films
Films directed by Albert C. Gannaway
1950s American films